Jorge Valín Sánchez (born 14 March 2000) is a Spanish professional footballer who plays for Cornellà, on loan from Deportivo de La Coruña, as a right-back.

Club career
Born in A Coruña, Galicia, Valín joined Deportivo de La Coruña's youth setup in 2014, from Victoria CF. He made his senior debut with the reserves on 8 October 2017, playing the entire second half of a 1–0 Segunda División B home win against Real Valladolid B.

On 31 May 2019, after establishing himself as a starter for the B-team, Valín renewed his contract with Dépor for two further seasons. He made his first team debut on 13 October, playing the full 90 minutes in a 0–3 away loss against UD Las Palmas in the Segunda División.

References

External links

2000 births
Living people
Footballers from A Coruña
Spanish footballers
Association football fullbacks
Segunda División players
Segunda División B players
Tercera División players
Deportivo Fabril players
Deportivo de La Coruña players
UE Cornellà players